The Trans Europa Naturgas Pipeline (TENP) is a natural gas pipeline which runs from the German-Netherlands border to the German-Swiss border.  It carries North Sea natural gas from the Netherlands to Italy and Switzerland. It also provides natural gas for North Rhine-Westphalia, Rhineland-Palatinate and Baden-Württemberg federal states.

History
The TENP was built in 1972–1974, and upgraded in 1978 and 2009.

Route
The pipeline runs from the German-Netherlands border near Aachen to the German-Swiss border near Schwörstadt. In the German-Swiss border it is connected with the Transitgas Pipeline.  En route, in Stolberg the pipeline is connected with the pipeline from Zeebrugge and in Mittelbrunn it is connected with the transport system of the MEGAL pipeline system which transports Russian natural gas from the German-Czech border to German regions and France.

Technical features
It has a capacity of 15.5 billion cubic meters per year which the operator intends to increase by 2 billion cubic meters per year. The pipeline comprises four compressor stations.

Company
The pipeline is owned and operated by Trans Europa Naturgas Pipeline GmbH & Co. KG, a joint venture of Open Grid Europe (51%) and Fluxys (49%). It is operated by Open Grid Europe.

Antitrust case
Since 2007, the European Commission has been probing Eni's alleged restrictive practices on the TAG, Transitgas and TENP pipelines by limiting third parties access to the pipelines.  The hearing is set for 27 November 2007.

References

Energy infrastructure completed in 1974
Natural gas pipelines in Germany